Emmanuel Smith (born July 25, 1995) is an American football linebacker for the Seattle Sea Dragons of the XFL. After playing college football for the Vanderbilt Commodores, he signed with the Atlanta Falcons as an undrafted free agent in 2018.

Professional career

Atlanta Falcons
Smith signed with the Atlanta Falcons as an undrafted free agent following the 2018 NFL Draft on May 1, 2018. He was waived during final roster cuts on September 1, 2018.

Tampa Bay Buccaneers
Smith signed to the Tampa Bay Buccaneers' practice squad on December 11, 2018. He signed a reserve/futures contract with the team after the season on December 31, 2018. He was waived during final roster cuts on August 30, 2019.

Kansas City Chiefs
Smith signed to the Kansas City Chiefs' practice squad on September 2, 2019. He won Super Bowl LIV as a practice squad member with the Chiefs after they defeated the San Francisco 49ers 31–20. He re-signed with the Chiefs after the season on February 5, 2020.

Smith was waived/injured on August 27, 2020, and reverted to injured reserve the next day. He was waived from injured reserve with an injury settlement on September 4. He was re-signed to the team's practice squad on October 20, 2020. He was elevated to the active roster on December 19 for the team's week 15 game against the New Orleans Saints, and reverted to the practice squad after the game. He suffered a hamstring injury in the game, and was placed on the practice squad/injured list on December 26.

On February 9, 2021, Smith re-signed with the Chiefs. He was released on August 31, 2021.

Seattle Sea Dragons 
On November 17, 2022, Smith was drafted by the Seattle Sea Dragons of the XFL.

References

External links
Kansas City Chiefs bio
Vanderbilt Commodores football bio

1995 births
Living people
American football linebackers
Vanderbilt Commodores football players
Atlanta Falcons players
Tampa Bay Buccaneers players
Kansas City Chiefs players
Seattle Sea Dragons players
Players of American football from Tennessee